Yeghiazaryan, also transliterated as Yegiazaryan and Egiazaryan, is an Armenian surname. Notable people with the surname include:

Ashot Yeghiazaryan (born 1943), politician
Ashot Egiazaryan (born 1965), politician and businessman
Grigor Yeghiazaryan (1908–1988), composer
Boris Yeghiazaryan (born 1956), Armenian artist. :uk:Єгіазарян Борис
Hayk Yeghiazaryan (born 1972), weightlifter
Vachik Yeghiazaryan (born 1991), wrestler

Armenian-language surnames